Hambletonian may refer to:

Hambletonian (horse) (1792–1818), an English Thoroughbred racehorse, sometimes known as Hambletonian I
Hambletonian 10 (1849–1876), an American foundation sire of the harness racing breed known as the Standardbred.
Hambletonian Stakes, a major American harness race
The Hambletonian Classic, a New Zealand trotting race